Florent Delay (born 23 August 1971) is a retired Swiss football goalkeeper and currently goalkeeping coach of Lausanne-Sport club Swiss Challenge League.

References

1971 births
Living people
Swiss men's footballers
Neuchâtel Xamax FCS players
FC Sion players
Yverdon-Sport FC players
Association football goalkeepers
Swiss Super League players